F&M Bank may refer to:

 Any one of many Farmers and Merchants Banks (or variations);  see Farmers and Merchants Bank (disambiguation)
 Any one of several Farmers and Mechanics Banks (or variations);  see Farmers and Mechanics Bank (disambiguation)